United Nations Security Council Resolution 6, adopted unanimously on May 17, 1946, listed dates when the Security Council would review new applicants for the UN.  The resolution was amended on July 24 because of the postponement of the opening date of the second part of the first session of the General Assembly.  The dates in the original resolution were pushed back as many days as was the interval between the anticipated convening day and the actual one.

See also
 List of United Nations Security Council Resolutions 1 to 100 (1946–1953)

References
Text of the Resolution at undocs.org

External links
 

 0006
 0006
 0006
May 1946 events